Gustavianum is the oldest standing building of Uppsala University. It was built between 1622 and 1625, and was used as the main building of the university between 1778 and 1887. Since 1997, it has been used as the university's museum.

History 
During the 16th century, Uppsala University was in decline, and by the latter part of the century tutoring had stopped almost entirely. During Uppsala Synod in 1593, however, there was an official decision to re-open the university. Due to the increasing number of students, the medieval university building  was no longer able to house the entire university; therefore, a second university structure became necessary.

Gustavianum was built between 1622 and 1625. The name Gustavianum comes from Gustavus Adolphus, who in the 1620s donated money for its construction. The building was designed by the Dutch architect  and contained lecture halls, printing halls and housing for gifted students without means. In 1662, the professor of medicine and polymath, Olaus Rudbeck, significantly expanded the building by adding another floor, as well as constructing the theatrum anatomicum within a large cupola on its roof. The anatomical theatre is today the second-oldest remaining anatomical theatre in the world.

The anatomical theatre was used until the 1750s, when more modern anatomical facilities were inaugurated in the neighbouring building, Konsistoriehuset. The cupola was instead used as the University Library until the construction of the current library Carolina Rediviva in 1841. The cupola was later used as a zoological museum. In 1955, the anatomical theatre was restored according Olaus Rudbeck's original design.

During the 18th century, the building was renovated by the architect Carl Hårleman. After the demolition of Academia Carolina in 1778, Gustavianum became the main building of the university. It maintained this function until 1887, when University Hall was inaugurated. Teaching from the institutions of architecture, antiquity and Egyptology continued in the building until 1997, when it was rebuilt into a museum.

Museum Gustavianum 

Museum Gustavianum was inaugurated by King Carl XVI Gustaf on 17 June 1997. As the university museum, all of the exhibited objects are part of the university's collection. In 2016, the museum attracted 82,539 visitors.

The museum has five permanent exhibitions:

 The Anatomical Theatre, containing the theatre itself together with objects concerning Uppsala's medicinal history
 The Augsburg Art Cabinet, a 17th-century cabinet of curiosities containing approximately 1,000 different artifacts
 The Mediterranean Sea and the Gulf of the Nile, containing objects from classical antiquity, most of them being excavated by Uppsala University archaeologists
 Uppsala University history containing lecture note from the first semester of the university in 1477 and exhibitions concerning Uppsala scientists such as Carl von Linne, Anders Celsius and Nils von Rosenstein
 Valsgärde.

References

External links 
 Museum Gustavianum

Buildings and structures completed in 1625
Uppsala University
University museums in Sweden
Archaeological museums in Sweden
Egyptological collections in Sweden
Museums in Uppsala
Science museums in Sweden
Gustavus Adolphus of Sweden
Anatomical theatres
Viking Age museums
Domes